Maersk Eindhoven is a container ship in the Maersk Line fleet. The vessel was built in 2010 by Hyundai Heavy Industries in the Ulsan, South Korea ship-yard. The ship is named after the Dutch city of Eindhoven.

Design

General characteristics 
The  deadweight tonnage of Maersk Eindhoven is 142,105 metric tons and the gross tonnage of the ship is 141,716.

Power and propulsion 
The Maersk Eindhoven is powered by a single Hyundai-Wärtsilä 12RT-flex96C-B low-speed two-stroke crosshead diesel engine. The ship also has a  emergency diesel generator.

References 

Maersk Eindhoven

Container ships
2010 ships
Ships built by Hyundai Heavy Industries Group
Ships of the Maersk Line